Hidanohana Shigeyoshi (born 13 December 1953 as Osamu Hirabayashi) is a former sumo wrestler from Asahi, Gifu, Japan. He made his professional debut in March 1969 and reached the top division in September 1980. His highest rank was maegashira 1. Upon retirement from active competition he became an elder in the Japan Sumo Association under the name Onoe. He left the Sumo Association in March 1994.

Career record

See also
Glossary of sumo terms
List of sumo record holders
List of past sumo wrestlers
List of sumo tournament second division champions

References

1953 births
Living people
Japanese sumo wrestlers
Sumo people from Gifu Prefecture